Xenopus egg extract is a lysate that is prepared by crushing the eggs of the African clawed frog Xenopus laevis. It offers a powerful cell-free (or in vitro) system for studying various cell biological processes, including cell cycle progression, nuclear transport, DNA replication and chromosome segregation. It is also called Xenopus egg cell-free system or Xenopus egg cell-free extract.

History
The first frog egg extract was reported in 1983 by Lohka and Masui. This pioneering work used eggs of the Northern leopard frog Rana pipiens to prepare an extract. Later, the same procedure was applied to eggs of Xenopus laevis, becoming popular for studying cell cycle progression and cell cycle-dependent cellular events. Extracts derived from eggs of the Japanese common toad Bufo japonicus or of the Western clawed frog Xenopus tropicalis have also been reported.

Basics of extract preparation
The cell cycle of unfertilized eggs of X. laevis is arrested highly synchronously at metaphase of meiosis II. Upon fertilization, the metaphase arrest is released by the action of Ca2+ ions released from the endoplasmic reticulum, thereby initiating early embryonic cell cycles that alternates S phase (DNA replication) and M phase (mitosis).

M phase extract

Unfertilized eggs in a buffer containing the Ca2+ chelator EGTA (ethylene glycol tetraacetic acid) are packed into a centrifuge tube. After removing excess buffer, the eggs are crushed by centrifugation (~10,000 g). A soluble fraction that appears between the lipid cap and the yolk is called an M phase extract. This extract contains a high level of cyclin B-Cdk1. When demembranated sperm nuclei are incubated with this extract, it undergoes a series of structural changes and is eventually converted into a set of M phase chromosomes with bipolar spindles.

Interphase (S phase) extract

Different types of egg extracts

Cycling extract

High-speed supernatant (HSS)

Nucleoplasmic extract (NPE)

Discoveries made using egg extracts
Purification of M-phase promoting factor (MPF)
Elucidation of the role of synthesis and degradation of cyclin B in cell cycle progression
Discovery that degradation of a protein(s) other than cyclin B is necessary for initiating chromosome segregation
Discovery of a mechanism of spindle assembly that depends on chromatin, but not centrosomes
Proposal of a DNA replication licensing system and identification of its responsible factor
Identification of importin α/β responsible for nuclear transport
Discovery of the condensin complex essential for mitotic chromosome assembly
Identification of the cohesin complex essential for sister chromatid cohesion

More recently, the egg extracts have been used to study reprogramming of differentiated nuclei, physical properties of spindles and nuclei, and theoretical understanding of cell cycle control.

See also 
 Yoshio Masui
 cell cycle
 Cdk1
 cyclin
 DNA replication
 nuclear transport
 spindle apparatus
 condensin
 cohesin

References 

Cell cycle
Mitosis
DNA replication